The 15th Politburo of the Chinese Communist Party was elected by the 15th Central Committee of the Chinese Communist Party on September 19, 1997. It was preceded by the 14th Politburo of the Chinese Communist Party. It served until 2002.

Standing Committee Members
Ordered in political position ranking 
Jiang Zemin
Li Peng
Zhu Rongji
Li Ruihuan
Hu Jintao
Wei Jianxing
Li Lanqing

Members
In stroke order of surnames:
Ding Guangen, Secretary of the Secretariat, head of the Propaganda Department
Tian Jiyun, Vice-Chairman of the National People's Congress
Zhu Rongji, Premier of the State Council
Jiang Zemin, General Secretary of the Communist Party, President of the People's Republic of China, Chairman of the Central Military Commission
Li Peng, Chairman of the National People's Congress
Li Changchun, Party Secretary of Guangdong
Li Lanqing, Vice Premier
Li Tieying, President of the Chinese Academy of Social Sciences
Li Ruihuan, Chairman of the Chinese People's Political Consultative Conference
Wu Bangguo, Vice Premier
Wu Guanzheng, Party Secretary of Shandong
Chi Haotian, Vice Chairman of the Central Military Commission, State Councilor, Minister of Defence
Zhang Wannian, Secretary of the Secretariat, Vice Chairman of the Central Military Commission
Luo Gan, Secretary of the Secretariat, Secretary of the Central Political and Legal Affairs Commission, State Councilor
Hu Jintao, Secretary of the Secretariat (first-ranked), Vice President of the People's Republic of China
Jiang Chunyun, Vice-Chairman of the National People's Congress
Jia Qinglin, Mayor, then Party Secretary of Beijing
Qian Qichen, Vice Premier
Huang Ju, Party Secretary of Shanghai
Wei Jianxing, Secretary of the Central Commission for Discipline Inspection, Secretary of the Secretariat
Wen Jiabao, Vice-Premier
Xie Fei, Vice-Chairman of the National People's Congress (died in office, 1999)

Alternate Members
Ordered in the number of ballots
Zeng Qinghong, Director of the General Office of the Chinese Communist Party, then head of the Organization Department
Wu Yi, State Councilor

External links 
  Gazette of the 1st Session of the 15th CPC Central Committee

Politburo of the Chinese Communist Party
1997 in China